The Salmon class were two destroyers built by Earle's to an Admiralty specification for service with the Royal Navy.

As was typical for torpedo craft at the time, the Admiralty left detailed design to the builders, laying down only broad requirements.

They were armed with one 12-pounder gun and two torpedo tubes. They carried a complement of 53 officers and men.

In May 1912 they were sold for breaking up.

In 1913 all surviving similar vessels built to the same requirement were reclassified as the  torpedo boat destroyers.

See also
A-class destroyer (1913)

Bibliography

References

Destroyer classes
 
Ship classes of the Royal Navy